Finnian may refer to:

 Finnian of Movilla (495–589), Christian missionary to Ireland
 Finnian of Clonard (470–549), Irish founder of the monastery of Clonard
 Finian Lobhar an early Irish saint credited with founding a church and monastery at Innisfallen in Killarney.

See also
 Finnan (disambiguation)
 Finan of Lindisfarne